Arena Sozopol is a football stadium in Sozopol, Bulgaria, with a seating capacity of 3,500. It has been the home of FC Sozopol since 2012, and hosted 8 games during the 2015 UEFA European Under-17 Championship, with an average attendance of 1,395 per game (11,154 in total).

Stands

North Stand
Constructed: 2012
Capacity: 2,000 (seated)

South Stand
Constructed: 2014
Capacity: 1,500 (seated)

Gallery

References

External links
Arena Sozopol, sozopol.org

Football venues in Bulgaria
Multi-purpose stadiums in Bulgaria